Bidyut Baran Mahato is an Indian politician and a member of parliament to the 16th Lok Sabha from Jamshedpur (Lok Sabha constituency), Jharkhand. He won the 2014 Indian general election being a Bharatiya Janata Party candidate. He also won the Lok Sabha Elections held in May 2019.

See also
Kurmi / Kudumi Mahato Community
Bidyut Baran Mahato member of 16th Parliament

References

India MPs 2014–2019
Living people
Lok Sabha members from Jharkhand
Bharatiya Janata Party politicians from Jharkhand
1963 births
India MPs 2019–present
Jharkhand Mukti Morcha politicians